Moonshine Music was an electronic music record label founded by Steve Levy and Ricardo Vinas, in Los Angeles in 1992, and later headquartered in West Hollywood, California. Moonshine released over 250 compilations albums, many of which were DJ mixed. Moonshine helped to launch the career of DJ Keoki and his side-kick producer Dave Audé. By publishing the work of British audiovisual artists Addictive TV, Moonshine became one of the first US dance labels to release a DVD.

Among Moonshine's other artists are NCT feat. Julie Harrington, Kellee, Robert Illes, Gary Butcher, D:Fuse, DJ Micro, AK1200, DJ Baby Anne, DJ Dara, DJ John Kelley, Dieselboy, Freaky Flow, Cirrus, Anabolic Frolic, Ferry Corsten, and Screaming Leads, DJ Feelgoo, Scott henry.

In 2000, Donald Glaude recorded a live set at Washington, DC's club night Buzz that was released as "Mixed Live: Buzz @ Nation" on Moonshine Music on June 26, 2001.

See also 
 Happy 2b Hardcore (1997)
 Law of the Jungle (1994)
 List of electronic music record labels

References

External links
 
 Moonshine Music at Rolldabeats.com

American record labels
Record labels established in 1992
Record labels disestablished in 2007
Electronic music record labels
Electronic dance music record labels
Drum and bass record labels
House music record labels
Trance record labels
Companies based in Los Angeles